Dighikala East is a Gram panchayat in Hajipur, Vaishali district, Bihar.
Dighikala East is a village (Now it has become a part of Hajipur Nagar Parishad.) in Hajipur block and located towards west from district headquarters Hajipur. It is 13km from state capital Patna.
Hajipur, Sonepur, Patna, are the nearby cities to Dighikala East. This place is in the border of the Vaishali District and Saran District. Saran District (Sonepur) is west towards this place.

Geography
This panchayat is located at

Panchayat office

Nearest city/town
Hajipur (Distance 3 km)

Nearest major road highway or river
NH 19 (National highway 19), NH 77, SH 49 ( state highway 49) And Railway line

Compass

Villages in panchayat
The following villages are in this panchayat

References

Gram panchayats in Bihar
Villages in Vaishali district
Vaishali district
Hajipur